The Iron Triangle Limited was a passenger train operated by Australian National between Adelaide, Port Pirie, Port Augusta, and Whyalla.

History
The Iron Triangle Limited first operated on 21 April 1986. It ceased operating on 31 December 1990 when all regional passenger services were withdrawn in South Australia.

Rolling stock
The train was formed of CB class railcars. It was operated on occasions by Bluebird railcars.

External links 

 Railpage - Iron Triangle Passenger Services
 Railpage - More Bluebird Timetables
 Railpage - Passengers service between Adelaide and Port Augusta

References

Named passenger trains of Australia
Rail transport in South Australia
Railway services introduced in 1986
Railway services discontinued in 1990
1986 establishments in Australia
1990 disestablishments in Australia
Discontinued railway services in Australia